Arum euxinum is a plant of the arum family (Araceae), native to northern Turkey, the area bordering the Black Sea .

References

euxinum
Flora of Turkey
Plants described in 1983